Ghanananda Saraswati (born Kewsi Essel; 12 September 1937 – 18 January 2016), commonly known as Swami Ghanananda,  was a prominent swami (sannyasi) of the indigenous Hindu community in Ghana, and the first Hindu swami of African ancestry. He was initiated as a swami by the late Swami Krishnananda of India in 1975, and was head of the Hindu Monastery of Africa in Accra, Ghana.

Biography

Early life
Swami Ghanananda was born as Kwesi Essel on September 12, 1937 in Senya Beraku, a village in the Central Region of Ghana. His family practiced a native Ghanaian faith, but his parents later converted to Christianity. From a very early age Swami Ghanananda was interested in the mysteries of the universe and read various religious texts.

Journey to India
After reading some books on Hinduism, Ghanananda travelled to Rishikesh in the Indian state of Uttarakhand, in northern India. He spent some time there with a spiritual guru who suggested him to open the monastery in Accra.

First meeting with Swami Krishnananda
In 1962, Swami Ghanananda moved to Accra and on 24 November, he formed the Divine Mystic Path Society. He then started correspondence courses on the Hindu way of life (Sanatana Dharma) with the Divine Life Society of Rishikesh, located in the foothills of the Himalayas in northern India, where he first met Swami Krishnananda of India and became his śishya (disciple), and then in 1975 Swami Krishnananda initiated Swami Ghanananda as a swami.

References

External links 

Ghana's unique African-Hindu temple at BBC News

1937 births
2016 deaths
Ghanananda, Swami
Ghanananda, Swami
Hindu missionaries
Hinduism in Ghana
Ghanaian Hindus
Ghanaian monks
Ghanaian missionaries